Bububu is a town on the Tanzanian island of Unguja, the main island of Zanzibar. It is located on the central west coast, 10 kilometres north of the Zanzibari capital of Stone Town.

The town is predominantly a densely populated industrial town, but it is also noted for its beach, which is one of the most renowned within easy reach of the capital.

One of the first railways in Zanzibar was built in 1905 to connect Bububu to Stone Town.

References
Finke, J. (2006) The Rough Guide to Zanzibar (2nd edition). New York: Rough Guides.

Villages in Zanzibar